Wayne Black and Kevin Ullyett were the defending champions but lost in the first round to Yevgeny Kafelnikov and Sargis Sargsian.

Kafelnikov and Sargsian won in the final 7–5, 4–6, 6–2 against Chris Haggard and Paul Hanley.

Seeds

  Bob Bryan /  Mike Bryan (first round)
  Wayne Black /  Kevin Ullyett (first round)
  Chris Haggard /  Paul Hanley (final)
  Gastón Etlis /  Martín Rodríguez (quarterfinals)

Draw

External links
 2003 Legg Mason Tennis Classic Doubles draw

2003 ATP Tour